Alta Partners is a venture capital firm based in San Francisco which invests primarily in biotechnology and life science companies.

History 
The company was founded in 1996 by Dr. Jean Deleage, Ph.D., who was also a founder of the venture capital firms Burr, Egan, Deleage & Co. (BEDCO) and Sofinnova, together with Guy Paul Nohra, Marino Polestra, and Garrett Gruener, all former general partners at BEDCO. 

Alta Partners is actively investing out of its latest early-stage fund called Alta Nextgen II by managing directors Dan Janney, Pete Hudson, MD, and Bob More. Co-founders Jean Deleage and Marino Polestra have died while Garrett Gruener is retired. Guy Nohra is currently managing Alta Spain I out of Barcelona, Spain.

The company was founded in 1996 and invested in biotechnology and life science companies.  According to the company website, over the past 22 years, Alta has invested in over 150 companies, including some of the leaders in the biopharmaceuticals, medical technology, healthcare services, and information technology sectors.

The firm is no longer associated with the Boston-based venture capital firms, Alta Communications or Polaris ventures, which also trace their roots to Burr, Egan, Deleage & Co.

Investment funds
Since 1996, Alta has raised nine venture capital funds, including four funds in its Alta California Funds series, three funds in its Alta Biopharma Partners series, Alta Partners VIII, and most recently, Alta Partners NextGen Fund I with $130 million of investor commitments.

The following is a summary of the venture capital funds raised by Alta as of 2018:

 1996 - $130m - Alta California Partners (Early Stage) 
 1998 - $180m - Alta Biopharma Partners I (Late Stage) 
 1998 - $186m - Alta California Partners II (Early Stage) 
 2000 - $212m - Alta Biopharma Partners II
 2000 - $229m - Alta California Partners III (Early Stage) 
 2003 - $300m - Alta BioPharma Partners III
 2004 - $184m - Alta California Partners IV (Early Stage) 
 2006 - $500m - Alta Partners VIII
2017 - $130m - Alta Partners NextGen Fund I (Early Stage)
2019 - $150m - Alta Partners NextGen Fund II (Early Stage)

Investments 
Notable investments include Kite Pharmaceuticals, ZS Pharma, Esperion, Allakos Chemgenx, DeCode Calistoga, Aerie, Cymabay, and Tyra Biosciences.

See also
Burr, Egan, Deleage & Co.
Alta Communications

References

Gupta, Udayan.  Done Deals: Venture Capitalists Tell Their Stories, 2000
Venture-Capital Firms Prepare for Next Generation of Partners
Jean Deleage (Forbes Profile)

External links
Alta Partners (company website)
Company profile at BioSpace

Financial services companies established in 1996
TA Associates
Venture capital firms of the United States
Life sciences industry